Agnivesh Ayachi (born 15 June 1995) is an Indian cricketer. He made his List A debut for Saurashtra in the 2016–17 Vijay Hazare Trophy on 1 March 2017.

In December 2018, he was bought by the Kings XI Punjab in the player auction for the 2019 Indian Premier League. He was released by the Kings XI Punjab ahead of the 2020 IPL auction.

References

External links
 

1995 births
Living people
Indian cricketers
Punjab Kings cricketers
Saurashtra cricketers
Place of birth missing (living people)

Charan